Harrisburg School District may refer to:

Harrisburg School District (Arkansas)
Harrisburg Community Unit School District 3, Illinois
Harrisburg R-VIII School District, Missouri
Harrisburg School District (Oregon)
Harrisburg School District (Pennsylvania)
Harrisburg School District (South Dakota)
Harrisburg School District (Texas)